"9 PM (Till I Come)" is a song by German DJ and producer ATB from his debut studio album, Movin' Melodies (1999). It was co-written by ATB, Angel Ferrerons, Julio Posadas and Yolanda Rivera. It features vocals by Spanish model Yolanda Rivera and a pipe organ hook created on guitar. The track's hook would later be reworked into the single "Don't Stop!" in 1999, which also featured on Movin' Melodies and also proved very popular.

"9 PM (Till I Come)" was released by Kontor and Radikal Records on 26 October 1998 as ATB's debut single. The song topped the UK Singles Chart and Irish Singles Chart, charting within the top 10 in Australia, Denmark, Greece, Italy, and Norway. A remake with German DJ producer Topic and Swedish singer A7S was released by Virgin Records on 15 January 2021. Tiësto also released a remix of the remake.

Background
The original draft of the song was titled "9 PM" after ATB overran time spent in studio creating it. The song was written and produced solely by ATB. It is composed in the key of A minor with a tempo of 130 beats per minute.

Critical reception
In The Independent, Barney Hoskyns cited the song's "purring titillation" as an example of trance music sublimating sexuality. NMEs Sarah Anderson called it "the woozy sound of Ibiza when it's just too hot" and described Rivera's vocals as "suitably breathy".

Chart performance
"9 PM (Till I Come)" peaked at number 14 on the German Singles Chart. Internationally, the song was also successful. The single entered at number one in the United Kingdom for the week ending 3 July 1999 becoming the first trance song to top the UK charts, and stayed there for two weeks, becoming the country's fifth best-selling single of 1999. As of July 2014, it has sold over 890,000 copies in the UK. The song was also number one in the Ireland for four consecutive weeks. It reached number three in Denmark, Italy, and Norway, number five in Flanders, and number 10 in Australia.

Track listings

 9 PM (Till I Come) (Amir Sattarpour Release_Iran Release)
 "9 PM (Till I Come)" (Radio Edit) – 3:14
 "9 PM (Till I Come)" (Club Mix) – 5:25
 "9 PM (Till I Come)" (9 PM Mix) – 6:07
 "9 PM (Till I Come)" (Sequential One Remix) – 6:33
 "9 PM (Till I Come)" (Gary D's Northern Light Remix) – 7:29
 "9 PM (Till I Come)" (Spacekid Remix) – 6:40
 "9 PM (Till I Come)" (Signum Remix) – 7:34

 9 PM (Till I Come) (Germany Release 1)
 "9 PM (Till I Come)" (Radio Edit) – 3:19
 "9 PM (Till I Come)" (Club Mix) – 5:25
 "9 PM (Till I Come)" (9 PM Mix) 6:10

 9 PM (Till I Come) (Germany Release 2)
 "9 PM (Till I Come)" (Radio Edit) – 3:14
 "9 PM (Till I Come)" (Club Mix) – 5:25
 "9 PM (Till I Come)" (9 PM Mix) – 6:07
 "9 PM (Till I Come)" (Sequential One Remix) – 6:33
 "9 PM (Till I Come)" (Gary D's Northern Light Remix) – 7:29
 "9 PM (Till I Come)" (Spacekid Remix) – 6:40

 9 PM (Till I Come) (The UK Mixes) (Germany Release)
 "9 PM (Till I Come)" (Radio Mix UK) – 2:43
 "9 PM (Till I Come)" (Signum Remix) – 7:33
 "9 PM (Till I Come)" (Sequential One 1999 Remix) – 6:33

 9 PM (Till I Come) (U.S. Release)
 "9 PM (Till I Come)" (Radio Mix) – 3:16
 "9 PM (Till I Come)" (Club Mix) – 5:27
 "9 PM (Till I Come)" (Sequential One Remix) – 6:33
 "9 PM (Till I Come)" (Gary D's Northern Light Remix) – 7:26
 "9 PM (Till I Come)" (Signum Remix) – 7:33

 9 PM (Till I Come) (UK Release 1)
 "9 PM (Till I Come)" (Radio Edit) – 3:14
 "9 PM (Till I Come)" (Club Mix) – 5:25

 9 PM (Till I Come) (UK Release 2)
 "9 PM (Till I Come)" (Radio Edit) – 2:43
 "9 PM (Till I Come)" (Sequential One 1999 Remix) – 6:33
 "9 PM (Till I Come)" (Signum Remix) – 7:33

 9 PM (Till I Come) (Australia Release)
 "9 PM (Till I Come)" (Original Radio Edit) – 3:17
 "9 PM (Till I Come)" (Club Mix) – 5:27
 "9 PM (Till I Come)" (9pm Mix) – 6:09
 "9 PM (Till I Come)" (Signum Remix) – 7:34
 "9 PM (Till I Come)" (Sequential One 1999 Remix) – 6:33
 "9 PM (Till I Come)" (Sequential One Original Remix) – 6:10

 9 PM (Till I Come) (Netherlands Release 1)
 "9 PM (Till I Come)" (Radio Edit) – 3:14
 "9 PM (Till I Come)" (9PM Mix) – 6:06

 9 PM (Till I Come) (Netherlands Release 2)
 "9 PM (Till I Come)" (Radio Edit) – 3:14
 "9 PM (Till I Come)" (9PM Mix) – 6:07
 "9 PM (Till I Come)" (Club Mix) – 5:25
 "9 PM (Till I Come)" (Sequential One Remix) – 6:33
 "9 PM (Till I Come)" (Gary D's Northern Light Remix) – 7:28

 9 PM (Till I Come) (Italy Release)
 "9 PM (Till I Come)" (Radio Edit) – 3:19
 "9 PM (Till I Come)" (Club Mix) – 5:28
 "9 PM (Till I Come)" (9 PM Mix) – 6:10
 "9 PM (Till I Come)" (Sequential One Remix) – 6:33

Charts

Weekly charts

Year-end charts

Certifications

Release history

"Your Love (9PM)"

A remake of the song titled "Your Love (9PM)" by ATB, German DJ and producer Topic and Swedish singer A7S was released by Virgin Records on 15 January 2021. It was written by the three artists and produced by ATB, Rudi Dittmann and Topic. ATB approached Topic through a mutual acquaintance about the idea of a remake after being inspired by the melancholic sound of his 2020 single "Breaking Me". They met in a studio in Germany for the collaboration and worked with A7S on the lyrics and vocals via Zoom. The lyrics were written in one take. It is composed in the key of A minor with a tempo of 126 beats per minute. A remix by Dutch DJ Tiësto was released on 26 March 2021.

"Your Love (9PM)" peaked at number nine on US Hot Dance/Electronic Songs, becoming the first top 10 single on the chart for ATB and the second for Topic and A7S. The song reached number eight in its tenth week on the UK Singles Chart with sales of 26,909 units, making it ATB's fourth UK top 10 and first since his 2000 single "Killer". In Germany, the remake charted higher than the ATB original at number six. It was certified gold in Germany and platinum in the UK.

Music video
The music video for "Your Love (9PM)" was directed by German director Martin Ströter and live premiered YouTube on 25 January 2021, preceded by a live chat with ATB and Topic. The video portrays the two DJs as judges at a dance performance audition. According to ATB, it has a message of unity; he said, "It was important for us to show that we often work better together than alone. Like the two main dancers, who only really harmonise when they dance together."

Track listing
Digital download and streaming
 "Your Love (9PM)" – 2:30

Digital download and streaming – Tiësto remix
 "Your Love (9PM)" (Tiësto remix) – 3:06
 "Your Love (9PM)" – 2:30

Personnel
 ATB – production, drums, mastering, guitar, bass, synthesizer, programming 
 Rudi Dittmann – production, mastering
 Topic – production, drums, mastering, bass, synthesizer, programming 
 A7S – vocals, vocal programming

Charts

Weekly charts

Year-end charts

Certifications

References

External links
 

1998 debut singles
1998 songs
ATB songs
Irish Singles Chart number-one singles
Number-one singles in Scotland
Songs written by André Tanneberger
UK Singles Chart number-one singles
Number-one singles in the Commonwealth of Independent States
Kontor Records singles
Ministry of Sound singles
Virgin Records singles